Golpura  is a village and a Panchayat in Dewas district in the Indian state of Madhya Pradesh. Dulwa Village is a major agricultural production area in Madhya Pradesh. In the 2011 Census of India its population was reported as 585.

References 

Villages in Dewas district